Levan (1573–1590), of the Bagrationi Dynasty, was a king of Imereti from 1585 to 1588.

Life
Levan succeeded on the death of his father, George II, in 1585 when he was twelve years old. With his ascend to the throne, Leon faced a revolt by his own uncle, Constantine, who defied the royal authority and took control of Upper Imereti. Leon made an alliance with the Mingrelian prince Mamia IV Dadiani, married his sister Marekhi, and forced Constantine to surrender in 1587. A year later, Imereti was invaded by Simon I, the resurgent king of Kartli in eastern Georgia, who sought to reunify all Georgian lands under his crown. Leon was forced to flee to the highland province of Lechkhumi, but was soon able to resume the throne after Simon had to return to Kartli. However, Leon soon quarreled with his brother-in-law Mamia IV Dadiani who defeated the king and imprisoned him at Fort Shkheti, Mingrelia, where he died in 1590.

References

 Вахушти Багратиони (Vakhushti Bagrationi) (1745). История Царства Грузинского: Жизнь Имерети.

1573 births
1590 deaths
Bagrationi dynasty of the Kingdom of Imereti
Kings of Imereti
Eastern Orthodox monarchs